Phalange Française (French for French Falange) was a Falangist political party in France founded and led by Charles Luca (pseudonym of Charles Gastaut). The party was founded in 1955 and dissolved on 15 May 1958 by a decree of the Pflimlin administration.

References 

Falangist parties
Political parties established in 1955
Political parties in France
1955 establishments in France